Wazirabad Tehsil , is an administrative subdivision (tehsil) of Wazirabad District in the Punjab province of Pakistan. The tehsil is headquartered at the city of Wazirabad and is administratively subdivided into 36 Union Councils.

History
During colonial rule the tehsil was formed as a subdivision of the Gujranwala District of British Punjab.  The population according to the 1901 census was 183,205 a slight increase from the 1891 census (183,606). According to the 1901 census the main towns were Wazirabad (population, 18,069), Ramnagar (7,121), Sodhra (5,050), and Akalgarh (4,961) - the tehsil also contained 254 villages. The land revenue and cesses in 1903-,4 amounted to RS. 2,70,000.

The Imperial Gazetteer of India (written over a century ago during the rule of the British) describes the tehsil as follows: "The tahsīl consists of a riverain belt along with the Chenab rich and highly developed tract along the Siālkot border, with abundant well-irrigation; and the level uplands known as the Bāngar. The head-works of the Chenāb Canal are at Khānkī in this tahsīl."

Towns and villages

 Ahmad Nagar Chattha
 Banka Cheema
 Bharoke Cheema
 Bhatti Ke
 Bhoma Bath
 Chandhar
 Dhaunkal
 Douburji Virkan
 Gunian wala
 Ghakka Mitter
 Hairanwala Kalan
 DadWali Sharif
 Hardo Warpal
 Hazrat Kalianwala
 Jamke Chattha
 Jaura
 Jhatan Wali
 Kaka Kolo
 Kot Inayat Khan
 Ladhewala Cheema
 Mansoor Wali
 Mardeke
 Mohlunke
Pathanke cheema 
 Nat Kalan
 Noian Wala
 Nokhar
 Qila Didar Singh
 Qila Mihan Singh
 Rasool Nagar
 Sodhra
 Verpal Chattha
 Wanjo Wali
 Wazirabad

References

Gujranwala District
Tehsils of Punjab, Pakistan